SCUMS is the eighth studio album from the Japanese band Nightmare. Like all the band's recent releases, this album was released in three different editions, each with different artwork. The 2 limited edition albums (Type A & B) each contain a different bonus DVD track and the standard (Type C) contains two extra tracks. The album peaked at #8 in the Oricon charts.

Track listing

Limited Edition A

Limited Edition B

NOTES

Single Information
Mimic
Released: February 29, 2012
Oricon Chart Peak Position: #9

Deus ex Machina
Released: November 28, 2012
Oricon Chart Peak Position: #11

References

2013 albums
Nightmare (Japanese band) albums
Avex Group albums
Japanese-language albums